Renata Knýová was a Czechoslovak slalom canoeist who competed from the mid-1950s to the late 1960s. She won three medals at the ICF Canoe Slalom World Championships with two silvers (Folding K-1 team: 1963, K-1 team: 1965) and a bronze (Folding K-1 team: 1955).

She died in 2013.

References

Czechoslovak female canoeists
Year of birth missing
2013 deaths
Medalists at the ICF Canoe Slalom World Championships